Asalpur Jobner railway station is a railway station in Jaipur district, Rajasthan. Its code is JOB. It serves Asalpur village and Jobner town. The station consists of 3 platforms. Passenger, Express  and Superfast trains halt here.

References

Railway stations in Jaipur district
Jaipur railway division